The Adventures of Maisie (aka Maisie) was a radio comedy series starring Ann Sothern as underemployed entertainer Maisie Ravier. It was a spin-off of Sothern's successful 1939–1947 Maisie movie series, based on a character created by Wilson Collison.

The series was broadcast on CBS Radio, NBC Radio, the Mutual Radio Network, and Mutual flagship radio station WHN in New York City.

Sponsored by Eversharp, the first series ran on CBS Radio from July 5, 1945 to March 28, 1947, airing on Thursdays at 8:30 p.m. during the first two months, then moving to Wednesdays at 9:30 p.m. (1945–46), then Fridays at 10:30 p.m. (1946–47). The supporting cast included Hy Averback, Arthur Q. Bryan, Hans Conried, Virginia Gregg, Peter Leeds, Johnny McGovern, and Sidney Miller. John "Bud" Hiestand was one of its many announcers, Harry Zimmerman and Albert Sack supplied the music, and John L. Greene produced. Tony Sanford directed scripts by Samuel Taylor and others.

The series was heard on the Mutual Radio Network from January 11 to December 26, 1952, and it was syndicated from 1949 to 1952 with Pat McGeehan as Eddie Jordan. Bea Benaderet and Elvia Allman portrayed Mrs. Kennedy. The supporting cast included Averback, Conreid, Leeds, McGovern, Lurene Tuttle, Ben Wright, Sandra Gould, and Jeffrey Silver. Harry Zimmerman led the orchestra with John Easton and Jack McCoy announcing.

The show popularized the 1940s catch phrase, "Likewise, I'm sure."

Listen to
Adventures of Maisie on Way Back When

References

Sies, Luther F. Encyclopedia of American Radio 1920-1960.  Jefferson, NC: McFarland, 2000. 
Terrace, Vincent (1981).  The Radio's Golden Years: Encyclopedia of Radio Programs, 1930-1960.  A. S. Barnes.

External links
The Definitive: The Adventures of Maisie
Jerry Haendiges Vintage Radio Logs: The Adventures of Maisie
 The Internet Archive holds 60 of the radio broadcasts

1940s American radio programs
1950s American radio programs
American comedy radio programs
CBS Radio programs
Mutual Broadcasting System programs
NBC radio programs